Kovasznay flow corresponds to an exact solution of the Navier–Stokes equations and are interpreted to describe the flow behind a two-dimensional grid. The flow is named after Leslie Stephen George Kovasznay, who discovered this solution in 1948. The solution is often used to validate numerical codes solving two-dimensional Navier-Stokes equations.

Flow description
Let  be the free stream velocity and let  be the spacing between a two-dimensional grid.  The velocity field  of the Kovaszany flow, expressed in the Cartesian coordinate system is given by

where  is the root of the equation  in which  represents the Reynolds number of the flow. The root that describes the flow behind the two-dimensional grid is found to be

The corresponding vorticity field  and the stream function  are given by

Similar exact solutions, extending Kovasznay's, has been noted by Lin and Tobak and C. Y. Wang.

References

Flow regimes
Fluid dynamics